Charles Kimball may refer to:

 Charles D. Kimball (1859–1930), American politician and Governor of Rhode Island
 Charles F. Kimball (1831–1903), American pastoral landscape and marine painter
 Charles L. Kimball, American film editor and writer
 Charles T. Kimball, Republican member of the Michigan House of Representatives
 Charles Kimball, American Baptist minister and professor, author of When Religion Becomes Evil
 Charlie Kimball (born 1985), American racecar driver
 Charles H. Kimball (1852–1887), American architect